Annemarie Ní Churreáin is an Irish poet from North West Donegal.

Career 
Ní Churreáin grew up in Donegal in a place called Cnoc Na Naomh.

She was educated at the Oscar Wilde Centre at Trinity College, Dublin. Ní Churreáin is fluent in Irish.

Ní Churreáin has received literary awards from Jack Kerouac House, Akademie Schloss Solitude, and Hawthornden Castle.

In 2016, Ní Churreáin was honoured with the Next Generation Artists Award from Michael D. Higgins on behalf of the Arts Council of Ireland. In 2018, she was awarded the inaugural John Broderick Residency Award by the Arts Council. In 2019, she was named one of two Writers in Residence at Maynooth University, Kildare.

In addition to her writing practice, Ní Churreáin is a panelist on the Writers in Irish Prisons Scheme and co-founder of the arts collective, "Upstart." In 2007, she established Ireland's first creative arts therapies outreach programme for people in need.

Bibliography 
Ní Churreáin's first poetry collection Bloodroot was published by Doire Press in October 2017. In 2018 it was shortlisted for the Shine Strong Award in Ireland and for the Julie Suk Award. Her second book Town is a special edition letter-press book published by The Salvage Press 2018.

Ní Churreáin's second full length poetry collection The Poison Glen was published by The Gallery Press, 2021.

References 

Irish poets
People from County Donegal
21st-century Irish people
Year of birth missing (living people)
Living people
Irish women poets
Alumni of Trinity College Dublin
Alumni of Dublin City University